Ernst Ernestovich Ballion (also known as Ernst von Ballion; ; 18 December 1816, in Novorossisk – 9 September 1901, in Novorossisk) was a Russian entomologist who specialised in  Coleoptera, especially Tenebrionidae.

Works
Partial list

 Eine centurie neuer Käfer aus der Fauna der russischen Reiches Bull. Soc. Imp. Nat. Mosc. 43,. 320–353 (1870).
 Verzeichniss der im Kreise von Kuldsha gesammelten Käfer, Bull. Soc. Nat. Mosc. 53 (2), 253–289 (1878).

Collections

His collections are conserved in the Zoological Museum of Odessa University and in the Forest Technical Academy Saint Petersburg where his extensive collection of world Lepidoptera is also conserved.

Coleopterists
Russian lepidopterists
1816 births
1901 deaths
Biologists from the Russian Empire
19th-century scientists from the Russian Empire
20th-century Russian scientists
People from Novorossiysk